Senator North may refer to:

Lois North (born 1921), Washington State Senate
Townsend North (1814–1889), Michigan State Senate
Walter H. North (1933–2014), Michigan State Senate
William Campbell North (1859–1924), Wisconsin State Senate
William North (1755–1836), U.S. Senator from New York in 1798